O Kanal (formerly TV1) is a Bosnian commercial infotainment television channel based in Sarajevo. It started broadcasting on 26 August 2010. The program airs continuously in the Bosnian language. Content includes news, series, talk shows, entertainment, sports, movies and documentaries.

Reporters and correspondents of O Kanal are located in Mostar, Tuzla, Zenica and Banja Luka.

Editors and TV hosts include: Zerina Ćosić Vrabac, Kenan Ćosić, Indira Šahbazović, Maida Burgić, Andi Mioč, Vladimir Čolaković, Amina Zornić, Mirza Salković

Journalists in the O Kanal newsroom include: Jovanka Nina Todorović, Adisa Herco, Bojan Govedarica

Production is based at a digitized television studio in Sarajevo, from which live events and "breaking news" programs on O Kanal are aired.

O Kanal is the owner of the Bosnian television network, Mreža TV, which airs popular series, movies, and sports programs.

Line-up

Previously on O Kanal

Foreign series

Documentaries

Documentary films  produced by Australian World Wide Entertainment production:
 Odlazak u svemir – (Quest)
 Historija odjeće I odjevanja – (Plimsolls to platforms)
 Okusi svijeta – (Cultural flavors)
 O zdravlju – (Inside health)
 Događaji koji su promijenili svijet – (Where were you?!)
 Ikone – (Icons)
 Superzvijezde – (Superstars)
 Drugi svjetski rat – (World War II)

Sports Programs
 La Liga broadcaster
 Formula One broadcaster (2011)
 Traditional jumps in Neretva river from the Old Bridge in Mostar (Live TV coverage)

References

External links 
 
 O Kanal on Facebook
 O Kanal News on YouTube
 O kanal Youtube
 Communications Regulatory Agency of Bosnia and Herzegovina

Mass media in Sarajevo
Television stations in Bosnia and Herzegovina
Television channels in North Macedonia
Television channels and stations established in 2010
2010 establishments in Bosnia and Herzegovina